T.R. Baskin (known as A Date with a Lonely Girl in the United Kingdom) is a 1971 American drama film directed by Herbert Ross. It stars Candice Bergen, Peter Boyle, Marcia Rodd and James Caan.

The screenplay by Peter Hyams focuses on a naïve young woman who moves to Chicago with the hope of finding romance and a fulfilling career.

Plot
When Jack Mitchell (Peter Boyle), a married middle-aged salesman with children from Utica, New York, meets his old friend Larry Moore while on business in Chicago, he asks him if he knows any prostitutes Jack can date while in town. Larry gives Jack T.R. Baskin's phone number, and Jack invites T.R to visit him at his hotel. T.R. arrives at the hotel and is relieved when Jack is impotent and cannot have sex, and she begins to tell Jack about her time so far in Chicago, a story that unfolds via flashback.

After flying to Chicago from Findlay, Ohio, T.R. first checks into a room at the YWCA and eventually rents a studio apartment in a dilapidated building in a run-down area of the city. She finds employment as a typist in a large corporation where she meets and befriends Dayle Wigoda (Marcia Rodd), who arranges a double-date for them. The man she is set up with proves to be a bigot and misogynist. T.R. realizes she'd rather be alone than spend time with such a callous individual. T.R meets other individuals at her job and becomes more affiliated with the city but seems uninterested in her surroundings.

One night, after leaving a noisy bar, T.R. sees a man reading a book at the window in a café. She joins him at his table and learns his name is Larry and he edits and publishes books. The two become friendly and go back to his apartment to discuss their lives. Larry is divorced and misses spending time with his children, while T.R. confesses she always has felt like an outsider. The two have sex, and the next morning T.R. feels she finally has taken the first step towards an intimate relationship, only to discover Larry has put a $20 bill in her coat pocket and mistaken her for a prostitute. Feeling betrayed and humiliated, she rushes out and walks the streets of Chicago contemplating what just happened while a voiceover of her saying that something "clicked" in her mind about what she wants to do with her life. Once she arrives at home, T.R. calls her parents to apologize for leaving home without telling them and has a breakdown.

Back in the hotel, T.R. and Jack discuss their current situations; why Jack is cheating on his wife with a prostitute, and why T.R is one. T.R tells Jack that she was tired of working as a typist and needed more excitement in her life and the two agree they are glad they met. The film ends with T.R leaving the hotel debating about whether she should continue being a prostitute or not and what she should do with her life.

Cast
 Candice Bergen as T.R. Baskin 
 Peter Boyle as Jack Mitchell 
 James Caan as Larry Moore 
 Marcia Rodd as Dayle Wigoda 
 Howard Platt as Arthur

Production
The film was shot at various Chicago locations, including the Carson Pirie Scott department store, the Sherman House Hotel, the First National Bank Building, and O'Connell's Coffee Shop on Rush Street.

Herbert Ross later stated, "I made a terrible mistake on T.R. Baskin. I was fooled by the script. I discovered in working on the script that it was like quicksand: the harder we worked, the more we investigated, the more damage we did. So after a while we were just trying to mask the flaws. It was a very salutary experience, because it helped me to learn how to evaluate a script."

Critical response

Vincent Canby of The New York Times noted the title character "is never at a loss for words, most of which sound as if they had come straight from the notebook of a writer who spent most of time jotting down funny lines without ever worrying much about character. It thus falls to Candice Bergen, a beautiful actress who projects intelligence, humor, vulnerability and self-reliance — all more or less simultaneously — to make something credible of the mouthpiece character written for her by Peter Hyams...Somewhere deep inside T.R. Baskin, there is, I suspect, a real, touching film crying to get out with something more than a wise-crack, but neither Hyams, nor Herbert Ross, the director, have been able to find it."

Roger Ebert of the Chicago Sun-Times awarded 2 stars out of 4 and wrote that the film "gets in trouble right off the bat with a flashback style that neatly drains away all of our interest in half of the story" and added "The problem is that everyone in the movie acts so stupidly. Real people of average intelligence would have cut through this plot in about three minutes, and the movie would have been over. It lasts two hours only because people are at such pains not to catch on."

Gene Siskel of the Chicago Tribune gave the film 1½ stars out of 4 and called it "badly written. If you are writing a movie about urban life that oppresses decent young women, it seems to me you'd better make sure your heroine is a decent young woman. The truth is that Miss Baskin gets almost everything she deserves...Verbally, T.R. is the female equivalent of the musclebound bully who used to kick sand in the faces of 99-pound weaklings."

Time stated "Peter Boyle...and James Caan...do the best they can, which is extremely well indeed, but the movie's clumsy feints at sophistication and its grotesque sentimentality prevail."

Variety wrote that the film "makes a few good comedy-comments on modern urban existence, but these are bits of rare jewelry lost on a vast beach of strung-out, erratic storytelling...Peter Hyams' debut production is handsomely mounted, but his screenplay is sterile, superficial and inconsistent...Bergen's screen presence is too sophisticated for the role, and both her acting, direction and dialog result in confusion."

Gary Arnold of The Washington Post wrote "It may be impossible to believe in Candy Bergen as a Girl Without a Date, but her T.R. is exceedingly bad company when she's out on the town. We're supposed to believe that fineness of sensibility sets her apart, but her speech and actions betray just the opposite: she seems appallingly vain and insensitive."

TV Guide rated the film 1½ stars and commented "Although she raises some interesting questions, Bergen's character evokes neither the sympathy nor the interest intended."

Filmink said the film is "written and directed by men... and looks it but isn’t without interest and co-star Marcia Rodd is terrific."

See also
 List of American films of 1971

References

External links

1971 films
1971 romantic drama films
American romantic drama films
1970s English-language films
Films about prostitution in the United States
Films directed by Herbert Ross
Films scored by Jack Elliott
Films set in Chicago
Films shot in Chicago
Films with screenplays by Peter Hyams
Paramount Pictures films
1970s American films